Gary Wilkins (born November 23, 1963) is a former professional American football player who played professionally as tight end in the National Football League (NFL) for six seasons with the Buffalo Bills and Atlanta Falcons.

References

External links
 

1963 births
Living people
American football tight ends
Atlanta Falcons players
Buffalo Bills players
Georgia Tech Yellow Jackets football players
Sportspeople from West Palm Beach, Florida
Players of American football from Florida